Watson is an unincorporated community in Marion County, West Virginia, United States. Its post office  is closed.

The community was named after Joseph Watson, the original owner of the town site.

References 

Unincorporated communities in West Virginia
Unincorporated communities in Marion County, West Virginia